Benjamin Garzy Mensah, professionally known as Mix Master Garzy, is a Ghanaian record producer, sound engineer, disc jockey and singer.

His major productions include "Pull Up" by Stonebwoy, "My Baby" by Stay Jay ft. R2Bees, "Boom boom tag" by Mista Silva, GH UK based "Enemies" by Jupitar featuring Sarkodie in 2014, "Iskoki" by Samini, "KoKo Sakora" by Dr Cryme featuring Sarkodie, "Alhaji" by VVIP featuring Patoranking, "Hookah" by Danagog featuring Davido, "Love You Die" by Patoranking featuring Diamond Platnumz, "Na Wash" by Becca, and "Obia Agye Obi Girl" by Captain Planet of 4x4 and more.

Early life
Garzy Mensah was born in Tema to Francis Anim Garzy and Ernestina Abena Kwao. He has a younger brother, John Otoo Kwao. He had his basic education and junior secondary education at Better Best Academy in Tema 4 poles, Ghana. He continued his senior high education at Tema Methodist Senior High School. He later attended the Ghana Institute of Journalism and obtained a certificate and diploma in Broadcast Journalism which gave him a step ahead to work as a part-time DJ at Xfm and Urban Internet Radio in Ghana.

Career
Mix Master Garzy commenced his career in beat making, mixing and mastering right from senior high school. After production work began he surfaced with his pro name Mix Master Garzy, an identity referring to the mixing and mastering side of studio work.

In 2015, he produced a master banger song, "Iskoki", for Samini. The song was nominated at that year's Vodafone Ghana Music Awards.

Garzy has worked with notable artists such as Atumpan, Samini, Sarkodie, Stonebwoy, Shatta Wale, Davido, Patoranking, Diamond Platnumz, Ice Prince, R2Bees, Becca, Eno Barony, and Eazzy.

Awards and recognition
He was nominated in the category of "Producer of the Year" at the 2015 Vodafone Ghana Music Awards.

He won "Riddim of the Year" at the 2016 Bass Awards for producing "iphone riddim", exclusive instrumental recorded by Mugeez of R2 Bees fame, Shatta Wale, Samini, Brenya, Ricky Mo, Capone, and Flexclusive.

On June 4, 2017, Garzy was given the Prestigious Gold Coast Award for his outstanding work in the Ghanaian music scene.

In 2017, he won "Best Music Producer of the year" at the Ghana Entertainment Awards organized in the US.

Awards and nominations

Tours

2017
In 2016, he had a successful European tour, "Book a studio with Mix Master Garzy".
In 2017 Garzy joined Nigeria's super star Patoranking on his exclusive European tour to launch his God Over Everything album, and was also the DJ for Patoranking on the tour.
 Coke Studio Africa 2017
Master Garzy appeared on the "Come From Far Europe Tour" with Ghanaian dance hall artist stonebwoy in 2017.

Production discography

Selected songs produced by Mix Master Garzy

Singles produced

2015

2016
Eazzy ft. Stonebwoy - "Nana Remix"
Danagog ft. Davido x Stonebwoy & Burnaboy - "Hookah Remix"
Itz Tiffany  ft. Ceeza Milli - "No More"
Deekay ft. Edem - "Gedeme"
Mc Clerk ft. 4x4 - "Success"
4x4 ft. Buk Bak - "Atongo"
Itz tiffany ft. Dammy Krane "Give Dem"
Dr Cryme ft. Master Garzy, Captain Planet - - "Bonanza"
Deon Boakye ft. kojo cue x Kofi Kinaata x Joel Cool - "Guy Guy"
Chase - "Forever Roll up"
4x4 - "No New Friends"
Shegah	- "Big It up"
Bisa Kdei ft. Patoranking - "Life"
Eno ft. Stonebwoy - "Touch Body"
Danagog ft. Davido - "Hookah"
Flexclusive - "The Only One"
Dr Cryme - "Control"
Capone	- "Dan Dem"
Eazzy - "Nana"
Eno ft. Shatta Wale - "Dawa"
Edem ft. Shatta Wale - "Gbom Gbom Gbang Gbang"
Stonebwoy ft. Burna Boy - "Sick Inna Head"
Jupitar - "Smile Again"

2017
Jupitar ft. Patoranking - "Whine"
Eno ft. Ebony - "Obiaa Ba Ny3"
Stonebwoy "Come From Far"
E.L - "Explain"
Tiffany - "Got it all"
Stonebwoy ft. Edem x Becca x Bisa Kdei x Dr Cryme x Choir Master - "Celebration"
Tinny - "God year"
Ramz Nic - "Me Do Wo"
Jupitar - "Go Low"
Bisa Kdei ft. patoranking - "Life"
Dammy Krane ft. Shatta Wale x Davido - "Gbetiti"
Patoranking - "Love You" Die ft. Diamond Platnumz 
Eze ft. Dammy Krane - "Gbera"
Becca ft. Patoranking - "Na Wash"
Bisa Kdei - "Apae"
Becca	ft. Stonebwoy "With You"
Keche - "Show Something"
Selekta Aff - "Back and front"
Fareed ft. Edem "- GoGa"
Sean Taylor - "Ginger"
Black Kat ft. Ekwea Dimples - "Talk About Me"
Mawunya - "Kw33gy3" 
Strongman ft. Yaa Pono - "Oh Joe"
Mc Fizzle - "Demma Nuh Bad Man" 
Tonkra - "Aben"
Stonebwoy ft. Kojo Funds - "Falling Again"

2018
2iice - Nah Beg,  Yebeye Dede (Mixed and Mastered)
2Kings ft Inyaya -  Your Body
Akeju ft Bennie Man - Kiss And Tell
Becca ft Sarkodie - Nana (Mixed and Mastered)
Bella - Rules 
Bisa Kdei - Asew ft Mic Flammez, Count On Me ft Mayorkun
Bobo Felima - Mama Mi 
Captain Planet ft Kidi - Love You Die 
D Cryme ft Stonebwoy - My Bae 
Eazzy - Move, Obaa gbemi 
Edem ft Stonebwoy - Power, Father 
Efe Keys ft D Cryme - Casanova (Mixed and Mastered)
Eno Barony ft Wendy Shay - Do Something Remix
Flexclusive ft Eno Barony - My Lover
GME ft D Cryme - Nonfa
Kenwus -  Medo
Koo Kyei ft Stonebwoy - Control It
Lilian Dinma - No More Pain, Blessings, I Pray
Liwin ft Guru - Kojo Nkansah - (Mixed and Mastered)
Mic Flammez - Assa Kou
Elisante -  Don’t Leave Me 
Nedro - Alright
Opanka - Coming Soon
Patoranking - Suh Different
Prayie - Disco
Samini - Obaa, World Wide
Stonebwoy - Enemies ft Baby Jet, Wame ft Casper, Tomorrow, Top Skanka, World Wide STD, Kpoo Keke ft Medikal, Darko Vibes, Kelvin Boy, Kwesi Authur (Mixed and Mastered)

Albums produced
HighLife Konnect by Bisa Kdei 
Show Time by D Cryme
Believe by Lilian Dinma
Untamed by Samini

References

External links

Mix Master Garzy at Twitter

Ghanaian record producers
Living people
1988 births